Ruth Leiserowitz (born Ruth Kibelka; 25 December 1958 in Prenzlau, Brandenburg) is a German historian. Her work and study primarily deal with the wolf children, a group of German children orphaned at the end of World War II in East Prussia. Since 2009, she has been the deputy director of the German Historical Institute in Warsaw. In 2014, she was awarded the Cross of Merit First Class of the Order of Merit of the Federal Republic of Germany by German president Joachim Gauck.

Publications
Auch wir sind Europa: zur jüngeren Geschichte und aktuellen Entwicklung des Baltikums (We are also Europe: The recent history and current development of the Baltics); 1991; 
Leben danach: Nordostpreussen 1986–1993 (Afterlife: East Prussia 1986–1993) (with Ann Tenno); 1995; 
Wolfskinder: Grenzgänger an der Memel (Wolf children: Commuters at Memel); 1996; 
Vilko Vaikai – kelias per Nemuną (Wolf's children through the Neman); 2000; 
Ostpreußens Schicksalsjahre 1944–1948 (East Prussian years of fate 1944–1948); 2000; 
Memellandbuch: Fünf Jahrzehnte Nachkriegsgeschichte (Memelland Book: Five decades of postwar history); 2002; 
Von Ostpreußen nach Kyritz: Wolfskinder auf dem Weg nach Brandenburg (From East Prussia to Kyritz: Wolf children on the way to Brandenburg); 2003; 
Sabbatleuchter und Kriegerverein: Juden in der ostpreußisch-litauischen Grenzregion 1812–1942 (Sabbath candlesticks and warrior clubs: Jews in the East Prussian-Lithuanian border region 1812–1942); 2010;

References

External links
Literature by and about Ruth Leiserowitz in the catalog of the German National Library

20th-century German historians
1958 births
Officers Crosses of the Order of Merit of the Federal Republic of Germany
Living people
21st-century German historians